Bonair Express (legally Dutch Eagle Express N.V) was an airline based in Bonaire, Netherlands. It was the regional airline for the Netherlands Antilles and also acted as a feeder for DutchCaribbeanExel while under the BonairExel brand and part of the ExelAviation Group and later for KLM for its long-haul services to Europe. Its main base was in Bonaire, with focus cities in Aruba and Curaçao.

History
The airline was established in 2003 and started operations on August 18, 2003. It was formerly known as BonairExel and was wholly owned by Bonair Bellegings Participatie Maatschappij. BonairExel formed part of the ExelAviation Group as the initial feeder between the islands of the Netherlands Antilles. On April 30, 2005 BonairExel was merged with Curaçao Express and both companies assets and personnel where transferred which together formed Dutch Antilles Express.

Initially, regarding aircraft, those flying under the BonairExel brand were used interisland between Aruba, Bonaire and Curaçao. The one under CuraçaoExel was used on the Bonaire-Curaçao-Sint Maarten route and the one under ArubaExel was planned to be used on the Aruba-Venezuela routes connecting to and from Bonaire/Curaçao but never commenced due to the dismantling of the ExelAviation Group. The Embraer 145 was planned to be used to the fly to the United States but was considered too small in size and baggage space.

Destinations
Bonair Express operated the following services (by January 2005):

Fleet

The Bonaire Express fleet consisted of the following aircraft (at January 2005):

Accidents and incidents
On September 2004, an ATR 42-320 (registered PJ-XLM) had to make an emergency landing due to a small fire that started in the number 2 engine. The plane was flying from Bonaire to Curaçao when the passengers sitting on the left side of the aircraft noticed that smoke was coming out of the engine. The aircraft landed safely at Curaçao International Airport and no one was hurt. A few weeks later, the aircraft was restored and continued flying with DAE until its bankruptcy.

See also
Curaçao Express
List of defunct airlines of the Netherlands Antilles

References

Defunct airlines of the Netherlands Antilles
Defunct airlines of Bonaire
Airlines established in 2003
Airlines disestablished in 2005
2003 establishments in the Netherlands Antilles
2005 disestablishments in the Netherlands Antilles